The Sandpiper 565 is trailerable sailboat that was designed by the British-based Portuguese naval architect Leonardo da Costa Sayago and first built in 1972. The design is out of production.

Production
The boat was built by Sandpiper Marine of Southampton, England, United Kingdom and C&L Boatworks in Canada, with a total of 1500 completed.

Royalties were not paid by C&L Boatworks to produce the design.

The design was also produced under license in Sweden as the Ockelbo OS 19.

Design

The Sandpiper 565 is a small recreational keelboat, built predominantly of glassfibre, with wood trim. It has a fractional sloop rig, a transom-hung rudder and a retractable fin keel. It displaces  and carries  of iron ballast.

The design includes a high freeboard and  a deep cockpit. It has sleeping accommodation for two adults and two small children below decks. The Sandpiper 565 was designed to be transported on a trailer towed by an automobile. With its fully retractable daggerboard keel it can operate in shallow water, including being easily beached.

Operational history
In a review Michael McGoldrick wrote, "The Sandpiper's cabin has some real lounging space and plenty of room to sleep two adults, and possibly one or two young children. (The advertising literature claims that this boat can sleep 4 adults, which, strictly speaking, is true). This boat does have a fairly small cockpit, and with a total weight of 1200 pounds, it is starting to be a heavy load to pull behind a family car."

See also

List of sailing boat types

Similar sailboats
Buccaneer 200
Cal 20
Catalina 18
Com-Pac Sunday Cat
Drascombe Lugger
Edel 540
Hunter 18.5
Hunter 19-1
Hunter 19 (Europa)
Mercury 18
Mistral T-21
Naiad 18
Paceship 20
Sanibel 18
San Juan 21
Santana 20
Siren 17
Sirius 22
Typhoon 18

References

External links

Keelboats
1980s sailboat type designs
Sailing yachts 
Trailer sailers
Sailboat types built by Leonardo da Costa Sayago
Sailboat types built by Sandpiper Marine
Sailboat types built by C&L Boatworks